Overture: Live in Nippon Yusen Soko 2006 is a live improvisation album by Japanese band Ghost. It was recorded in a former warehouse space. The audience was not permitted to leave the venue until the performance was complete. The band members were hidden from each other and only able to hear each other. The music was improvised from start to finish. The album came with a bonus DVD of the performance.

Track listing
 Overture (56:03)

References

2007 live albums
Ghost (1984 band) albums
Drag City (record label) live albums